Actian Zen (named Pervasive PSQL before version 13) is an ACID-compliant database management system (DBMS) developed by Pervasive Software. It is optimized for embedding in applications and used in several different types of packaged software applications offered by independent software vendors (ISVs) and original equipment manufacturers (OEMs). It is available for software as a service (SaaS) deployment due to a file-based architecture enabling partitioning of data for multitenancy needs.

Applications can store the data and the relationships in tables in a relational model (RDBMS) or store the data in a schema-less way with no fixed data model (key-value store).

Pervasive PSQL runs on system platforms that include Microsoft Windows, Linux, and Mac OS X. Both 32-bit and 64-bit editions of Pervasive PSQL are available. Editions are also specifically designed for different computer networking deployment needs, such as workgroup, client-server, and highly virtualized environments, including Cloud computing.

The original name for Pervasive PSQL was Btrieve. Pervasive Software was acquired by Actian Corporation in 2013.

Uses and customers
Because Pervasive PSQL is used for embedded databases, and sold indirectly, it is not well known.
Pervasive PSQL is embedded by OEMs like Sage, maestro* Technologies, ABACUS Research AG (Switzerland), and Unikum (Sweden) in packaged software applications that address the accounting, finance, retail, point-of-sale, entertainment, reservation system, and medical and pharmaceutical industry segments. “Users include Novell, Microsoft, PeachTree Software, Fair Isaac, Disney World, Radio Shack, Cardiff and others.” The accounting industry formed a large part of its market in 2007.

Historically, Pervasive PSQL  served as a DBMS for small and medium enterprises.

DBMS architecture

Pervasive PSQL supports stand-alone, client-server, peer-to-peer and software-as-a-service (SaaS) architecture.

The central architecture of Pervasive PSQL consists of two database engines: (1) the storage engine, known as MicroKernel Database Engine (MKDE) and described by Pervasive Software as a transactional database engine and (2) the relational database engine, known as SQL Relational Database Engine (SRDE). Both engines can access the same data, but the methods of data access differ.

MicroKernel Database Engine

Pervasive's transactional database engine, the MicroKernel Database Engine, interacts directly with the data and does not require fixed data schema to access the data. It uses key-value store to store and access the data. Calls to the MKDE are made programmatically with Btrieve API rather than through the use of a query language; therefore, Pervasive PSQL does not have to parse the request. This places the MicroKernel Database Engine in the category of NotOnlySQL databases. Low-level API calls and memory caching of data reduce the time required to manipulate data.

The MKDE operates in complete database transactions and guarantees full ACID (Atomicity, Consistency, Isolation, Durability). If a transaction does not fully run its course due to an external event such as a power interruption, the data remains in the state in which it existed before the transaction began to run.

In the MKDE, records are stored in files which are roughly equivalent to the tables of a relational database engine. It supports multiple keys on a record and therefore multiple indexes in the file. The MKDE caches data in memory to facilitate performance. When a call is made to the MKDE, cached data is searched first; physical storage is searched if there is no cache of the data. Configuration settings for caches can be pre-configured by ISVs to optimize Pervasive PSQL performance for their applications.

Relational Database Engine

The second database engine, the SQL Relational Database Engine or SRDE, operates in a manner similar to other relational database engines, that is, through the support of Structured Query Language queries. SRDE parses SQL queries and sends them to the MKDE to run.

The SRDE implements SQL-92. Significant other features include relational integrity, database security, and temporary tables. SRDE extends its functionality by supporting stored procedures, user-defined functions, and triggers.

In addition to its support for SQL-92, the SRDE supports several significant features of COBOL: COBOL data types and COBOL OCCURS and VARIANT records.

Additional features

Pervasive PSQL provides the following additional features:
 Multi-core processor aware
 IPv4 and IPv6 support
 Row-level locking
 Record and page compression
 Over-the-wire encryption and data encryption
 Cluster environments compatibility
 I18N support, code page (including UTF-8) translation between data files and SQL clients, Unicode support in Btrieve API, Japanese localization
 Data backup agents or enablers with Pervasive Backup Agent and Pervasive PSQL VSS Writer
 Data auditing with Pervasive AuditMaster
 Data replication with Pervasive DataExchange

Interfaces

Pervasive PSQL interfaces fall into two categories: management interfaces and data manipulation interfaces.

Management interfaces

Pervasive Software provides the management interfaces Distributed Tuning Interface (DTI) and Distributed Tuning Objects (DTO), a Component Object Model (COM) adapter pattern (wrapper) for the DTI. These provide application programming interfaces for configuration, monitoring, and diagnostics of Pervasive components. COBOL can also provide component management through a COBOL connector that can talk to DTI.

Application interfaces

All other interfaces exist for data manipulation purposes.
 Btrieve, Java Class Library (JCL), COBOL, and ActiveX provides direct access to the MicroKernel Database Engine (MKDE).
 ADO.NET; ODBC v3.51 and JDBC 2 for Core, Level 1, and Level 2; and OLE DB provide access to the SQL Relational Database Engine (SRDE).
 Pervasive Direct Access Components (PDAC) are a set of Visual Component Library (VCL) components that enable direct access to both MKDE and SRDE for Embarcadero Delphi and C++ Builder environments.

Tools

Pervasive provides utility software designed to facilitate administration and use of Pervasive PSQL. There are graphical and command line utilities in Windows, Linux, and Mac OS X environments.

Pervasive Control Center (PCC) is the main utility that enables the user to create and manipulate databases and tables, to access servers and clients, to set configuration, properties, and to edit data. Through PCC, the user can access a series of other utilities:
 License Administrator utility handles license management activities.
 Notification Viewer utility displays licensing-related messages logged by the PSQL engine.
 Monitor utility checks and displays activities and attributes of both engines, including resource usage, session information, and communication statistics.
 Pervasive System Analyzer utility tests the connections between the engines and within the network and displays information about system components.
 Maintenance utility enables users to create and edit schema-less files.
 Rebuild utility enables users to convert file formats and rebuild files in its MKDE file format.
 DDF (data definition file) Builder utility enables SQL users to create and modify table schemas for data stored in the MKDE, thus providing relational access to the data.
 Query Plan Viewer enables SQL users to analyze query plans for optimization.
 Function Executor assists developers with development, testing, and debugging by simulating direct API operations into MKDE and providing a view into the schema-less data.

Versions

See Btrieve, beginning with Pervasive.SQL 7.

Editions and licensing

Editions

There are four editions of PSQL: Pervasive PSQL Client, Pervasive PSQL Workgroup, Pervasive PSQL Server, and Pervasive PSQL Vx Server.
 Pervasive PSQL Client is designed for use with Pervasive PSQL Server and Pervasive PSQL Vx Server in a client-server network.
 Pervasive PSQL Workgroup edition is intended for single- and multi-engine configurations with up to five users.
 Pervasive PSQL Server edition is intended for configurations that have at minimum ten concurrent connections and it is scalable up to thousands of concurrent network users in client-server network and web-based applications on the enterprise level.
 PSQL Vx Server runs under hypervisors in a VM environment. It is designed for customers “who need support for highly virtualized environments enabling live migration, fault tolerance, high availability and cloud computing.”

Licensing

Pervasive Software uses two different licensing models, user-count licensing and capacity-based licensing.
 In user-count licensing, each product key specifies a licensed user. At any given moment, that many users can be connected to the engine.
 Capacity-based licensing is based on the amount of processing performed by the database engine. It measures data in use and sessions in use. This license model is designed to facilitate Cloud computing and highly virtualized environments.

Both PSQL Server and PSQL Workgroup use a user-count licensing model, while PSQL Vx Server uses capacity-based licensing.

Limitations

Pervasive PSQL lacks:
 some of the data warehousing, data mining, and reporting services built into database engines such as MySQL and Microsoft SQL Server.
 Unicode support in the RDBMS layer.
 the ability to perform distributed transactions.
 support for database caching unless the application has specifically been designed to take advantage of the Client Caching Engine(very few applications take advantage of this feature), the inbuilt feature of the engine and only supported caching option. Because the engine does not natively support database contention negotiation but relies on the front-end to manage contention issues, it is infrequently implemented. This makes the majority of applications developed with Pervasive PSQL unsuitable on any system where network or host server performance could cause a performance bottleneck.

See also
 Connolly, P.J., “Pervasive Living Up to Its Name at 25”, SD Times, 3/15/2007, http://www.sdtimes.com/content/article.aspx?ArticleID=30319
 DatabaseJournal.com Staff, “Pervasive Expands Linux Database Offering to Support Linux Desktop and Embedded Data Needs” Database Journal, 6/17/2003, http://www.databasejournal.com/news/article.php/2223111
 DatabaseJournal.com Staff, “ Pervasive.SQL Database Updated to Enhance Security of Mission-critical Data” Database Journal, 7/22/2003, http://www.databasejournal.com/news/article.php/2238931
 Domingo, Michael, “Pervasive PSQL Certified for Windows 2008, Adds Linux Support”, Application Development Trends, 3/14/2008, http://adtmag.com/articles/2008/03/14/pervasive-psql-certified-for-windows-2008-adds-linux-support.aspx
 Information Management Editorial Staff, “40 Vendors We’re Watching in 2011”, Information Management, 3/1/2011, http://www.information-management.com/issues/21_2/40-vendors-were-watching-in-2011-10019878-1.html?pg=2
 Kilburn, Will, “Pervasive joins Magic; unveils Linux DBMS”, Application Development Trends, 6/11/2003, http://adtmag.com/articles/2003/06/11/pervasive-joins-magic-unveils-linux-dbms.aspx
 Kilburn, Will, “Pervasive upgrades database security”, Application Development Trends, 7/23/2003, http://adtmag.com/articles/2003/07/23/pervasive-upgrades-database-security.aspx
 Kyle, Jim, Btrieve Complete: A Guide for Developers and System Administrators, Addison-Wesley, 1995
 Marsan, Carolyn Duffy, "Database Firm Reports Rising Demand for IPv6", NETWORKWORLD, May 17, 2010, https://web.archive.org/web/20100523052202/http://www.networkworld.com/news/2010/051710-ipv6-pervasive-software.html
 Monash Research, “Pervasive Summit PSQL v10”, DBMS2, 9/24/2007, http://adtmag.com/articles/2003/07/09/pervasive-gains-advanced-database-search-engine.aspx
 Seeley, Rich, “Pervasive gains advanced database search engine”, Application Development Trends, 7/9/2003, http://adtmag.com/articles/2003/07/09/pervasive-gains-advanced-database-search-engine.aspx
 Seiden, Jeff, “Quotes from Partners Supporting Novell Linux Small Business Suite 9”, Novell, March 20, 2005, http://www.novell.com/news/press/2005/3/pr05024_quotes.html
 Trocino, Richard B., The Illustrated Guide to NetWare Btrieve 6.x, Golden West Products International, 1994
 White, Elizabeth, Armstrong, Bruce, and Remde, Kevin, “Pervasive Software Announces Pervasive PSQL Vx Server 11 for Virtualized Environments”, .NET Developer's Journal, 2/13/2012, http://dotnet.sys-con.com/node/2163895
 Whiting, Rick, "25 Infrastructure Software Vendors You Need to Know", CRN, July 26, 2011, http://www.crn.com/slide-shows/applications-os/231002581/25-infrastructure-software-vendors-you-need-to-know.htm;jsessionid=RjEiTtd9S-SaZB9p8vH9qA**.ecappj01?pgno=18

References

External links
  - product page
  - company site

Proprietary database management systems